Flap may refer to:

Arts, entertainment, and media
 Flap (film), a 1970 American film
 Flap, a boss character in the arcade game Gaiapolis
 Flap, a minor character in the film Little Nemo: Adventures in Slumberland

Biology and healthcare
 Flap (surgery), a surgical technique involving movement of vascularized tissue
 Free flap, a specific kind of surgical flap
 5-lipoxygenase activating protein (FLAP)

Computing and networks 
 The phenomenon of some variable or resource oscillating or alternating rapidly between two states
 Route flapping, when a network router flips between different routes
 Link flap, errant behavior in a communications link

Engineering and design 
 Flap (aeronautics), a lift augmentation device on an airplane wing, often near the trailing edge
 Flapping, the up-and-down motion of a helicopter rotor
 Flap, any hinged plate often used as a cover or a simple one-way valve
 Sluice or flap gate, a pressure driven water flow control device between a channel and other water body
 Bum flap (or butt flap), a separately removable part of underwear (un)covering the buttocks
 Mudflap, a guard for tires
 Pet door or pet flap
 Roof flap, an aerodynamic feature of race cars

Linguistics 
 Flap consonant, a sound produced by brief contact between one articulator (such as the tongue) and another (such as the roof of the mouth)

Other uses
 Flapping, one of the basic mechanics of bird flight

 Hand flapping, a common form of self-stimulatory behaviour

See also
 Flapper (disambiguation)

sk:Klapka